Vellington Fernandes (born 2 March 2003) is an Indian professional footballer who plays as a midfielder for Indian Arrows in the I-League.

Career
Vellington Fernandes made his first professional appearance for Indian Arrows on 10 January 2021 against Churchill Brothers as Substitute on 55th min.

Career statistics

References

2003 births
Living people
Indian footballers
Indian Arrows players
I-League players
Association football midfielders
Footballers from Goa